Qarah Qanlu (also Romanized as Qarah Qānlū) is a village in Jargalan Rural District, Raz and Jargalan District, Bojnord County, North Khorasan Province, Iran. At the 2006 census, its population was 417, in 95 families.

References 

Populated places in Bojnord County